The Awyu languages are a cluster of Papuan languages in Indonesian New Guinea. 

They number between five (bold below) and eleven, depending on one's criteria for a 'language':

South Awyu
Bamgi River Awyu (Oser, Jénimu/Yenimu)
Ia River Awyu (Sjìagha/Shiaxa)
Southeast Awyu (Jair)
Edera River Awyu
Lower Kia River Awyu
Upper Kia River Awyu
Central and West Awyu
North Awyu
Central Awyu
Mappi River Awyu (Aghu)
Pasue River Awyu 
West Awyu
Wildeman River Awyu (Pisà)
Asue River Awyu
Miaro River Awyu
Kewet River Awyu

(The placement and diversity of North Awyu is uncertain, due to lack of data.)

Further reading
Lebold, Randy, Ronald Kriens and Yunita Susanto. 2013. A Report on the Bamgi, Kia, and Lower Digul River Language Survey in Papua, Indonesia. SIL International.
Susanto, Yunita. 2004. Report on the Mapi River Survey South Coast of Irian Jaya. SIL International.

References

External links
Shiaxa at the Awyu–Ndumut research group at VU University Amsterdam: 

Languages of Indonesia
Greater Awyu languages